Daniele Cardelli (born 16 March 1995) is an Italian footballer who plays as a goalkeeper for  club San Donato.

Club career
He made his professional debut in the Lega Pro for Pontedera on 20 December 2014 in a game against Carrarese.

On 31 January 2019, he joined Cuneo on loan.

On 3 September 2019, his contract with Pisa was dissolved by mutual consent.

On 21 January 2020 he returned to Pontedera.

On 18 July 2021, he moved to San Donato.

References

External links
 
 

1995 births
Living people
People from Pescia
Sportspeople from the Province of Pistoia
Footballers from Tuscany
Italian footballers
Association football goalkeepers
Serie B players
Serie C players
Serie D players
Empoli F.C. players
U.S. Città di Pontedera players
Latina Calcio 1932 players
Pisa S.C. players
Casertana F.C. players
A.C. Cuneo 1905 players
San Donato Tavarnelle players